5 STAR Kitchen ITC Chef's Special is a 2020 Indian cookery show that debuted on 23 May 2020 on Star TV and Disney+ Hotstar. The show was created by ITC Foods in collaboration with Star network. Hosted by Dheeraj Juneja, it was primarily based upon Indian cuisine.

Overview 
5 STAR Kitchen ITC Chef's Special was a Hindi-language show that aired every Saturday and Sunday on Star TV. It ran for about six weekends and the first episode was broadcast on 23 May 2020. In each episode, the chefs of ITC Hotels shared recipes featuring Indian cuisine. The programmer was hosted by Dheeraj Juneja, who had previously presented cricket-based projects and was a host in Zee TV's Lagao Boli – Sabse Kam Sabse Anokhi with Anita Hassanandani and Paritosh Tripathi.

Telecast

References

External links 
 5 STAR Kitchen ITC Chef’s Special on YouTube

Indian cooking television series
2020 Indian television series debuts
Hindi-language television shows
StarPlus original programming